The 2005 European Tour was the 34th golf season since the European Tour officially began in 1972.

The season began with three tournaments held in late 2004 and consisted of 47 official money events, which was a new record total. This included four major championships and three World Golf Championships, which were also sanctioned by the PGA Tour. 27 events took place in Europe, ten in Asia, six in the United States, two in South Africa and one each in Australia and New Zealand. Total prize money exceeded €97 million, including nearly €40 million in the four major championships and three individual World Golf Championships events.

The Order of Merit race came down to the final tournament, and was won by Colin Montgomerie for a record eighth time, and the first since 1999. The Player of the Year award was given to Order of Merit runner up and U.S. Open champion Michael Campbell of New Zealand. The Sir Henry Cotton Rookie of the Year was Gonzalo Fernández-Castaño of Spain, who won his first title, the KLM Open during his début season.

Major tournaments

For a summary of the major tournaments and events of 2005, including the major championships and the World Golf Championships, see 2005 in golf.

Changes for 2005
Changes from the 2004 season included five new tournaments: the Volvo China Open and TCL Classic in China, making a total of five events in the country, the Indonesia Open, the New Zealand Open and the Abama Open de Canarias, as the tour retained a stop in the Canary Islands. The ANZ Championship, Open de Sevilla and The Heritage were lost from the schedule.

Schedule
The following table lists official events during the 2005 season.

Unofficial events
The following events were sanctioned by the European Tour, but did not carry official money, nor were wins official.

Order of Merit
The Order of Merit was based on prize money won during the season, calculated in Euros.

Awards

See also
2005 in golf
2005 PGA Tour
List of golfers with most European Tour wins

Notes

References

External links
2005 season results on the PGA European Tour website
2005 Order of Merit on the PGA European Tour website

European Tour seasons
European Tour